Burragorang was an electoral district of the Legislative Assembly in the Australian State of New South Wales for a single term from 1988 to 1991, named after the Burragorang Valley of the Wingecarribee River. Its only member was Ian McManus.

Members for Burragorang

Election results

1988

References

Burragorang
1988 establishments in Australia
Burragorang
1991 disestablishments in Australia
Burragorang